Redefining Darkness is the eighth studio album by the Swedish black metal band Shining. It was released through Spinefarm Records on 29 October 2012.
The album is dedicated to the memory of Trond Bråthen (a.k.a. "Trondr Nefas").

Track listing

LP track listing

Personnel

Shining
Niklas Kvarforth – vocals, guitars, keyboards
Peter Huss – guitars
Christian Larsson – bass guitar
Ludwig Witt – drums

Additional musicians
Hoest – additional vocals ("Du, mitt konstverk")
Andreas Huss – saxophone ("The Ghastly Silence")
Rob Caggiano – lead guitar (first guitar solo) ("Han som hatar människan")
Peter Bjärgö – additional vocals ("Hail Darkness Hail")
Olli Ahvenlahti – piano ("Det stora grå")
Andy LaRocque – lead guitar (second guitar solo) ("For the God Below")

Production
Trine + Kim Design Studio – artwork
Andy LaRocque, Shining – producer

References

Shining (Swedish band) albums
2012 albums
Spinefarm Records albums